Shelley Stephens (born 29 July 1978) is a New Zealand former professional tennis player.

She won two singles and 21 doubles titles on the ITF Circuit in her career. On 11 June 2001, she reached her best singles ranking of world No. 249. On 4 March 2002, she peaked at No. 133 in the doubles rankings.

Playing for New Zealand at the Fed Cup, Stephens has a win–loss record of 14–22. She made her WTA Tour main-draw debut at the 2001 ASB Classic in the doubles event, partnering with María Emilia Salerni.

Stephens retirement from tennis 2009.

ITF Circuit finals

Singles: 10 (2–8)

Doubles: 35 (21–14)

References

External links
 
 
 

Living people
1978 births
New Zealand female tennis players
20th-century New Zealand women
21st-century New Zealand women